In international diplomacy, JACKSNNZ is the colloquial name of an informal grouping of the world's affluent non-EU countries, excluding the United States.  The JACKSNNZ states are Japan, Australia, Canada, South Korea, Switzerland, Norway and New Zealand.

The term originated in the proceedings to the Sixth Review Conference of the Biological and Toxins Weapons Convention held in Geneva in 2006.  In the previous review conference talks broke down over American refusals to allow for a verification mechanism be established to monitor biological weapons programs in states parties.  This was against the wishes of other WEOG (Western European and Others Group) states, which also include Canada, Turkey, Australasia and Western Europe.  At the 2006 Review Conference the JACKSNNZ states remain supportive of a verification protocol (although are unlikely to push for it knowing that the current US government will not accede on this point).  However, the JACKSNNZ also seeks balance within the WEOG, and to protect the interests of non-EU states.

Takeshi Aoki, director of the Bioweapons and Chemical Weapons Conventions Division of the Japanese Ministry of Foreign Affairs said that JACKSNNZ is "neither a binding instrument, nor an exclusive one."  The JACKSNNZ states are yet to declare a common and exclusive position in other international fora under this name.

See also 
 CANZUK
 JUSCANZ
 Middle power
 Umbrella Group

References
 News Analysis, Bioweapons Treaty Progress Predicted. Arms Control Association website

Biological warfare
United Nations coalitions and unofficial groups
Japan and the United Nations
Australia and the United Nations
Canada and the United Nations
South Korea and the United Nations
Switzerland and the United Nations
Norway and the United Nations
New Zealand and the United Nations